Abigail Hing Wen (邢立美; born 1977) is an American writer, film producer, lawyer, and speaker. Her debut young adult novel, Loveboat, Taipei, was purchased in a multi-house auction by HarperCollins in a two-book deal, along with Loveboat Reunion. It debuted on the New York Times Bestseller List where it remained for multiple weeks and has been adapted for film by ACE Entertainment.

Loveboat, Taipei follows the journey of an Asian American teen whose parents send her from Ohio to Taipei to study Mandarin for the summer at a program nicknamed Loveboat. It is a coming-of-age story exploring love, family, multifaceted identity and intersectionality. Wen's companion novel, Loveboat Reunion, follows two of the main characters from Loveboat, Taipei as they reconnect and write their own futures on a wild, unexpected reunion. The novel draws inspiration from Wen's work in Silicon Valley, with a girl trying to navigate her fashion interests and interests in AI.

Early life 
Abigail Hing Wen was born Abigail Geraldine Lim Hing in Wheeling, West Virginia as a daughter of immigrants. Her father, Yung-Luy (Ray) Hing, emigrated from Indonesia at the age of thirteen and attended the University of Michigan. He is a former chemical engineer and works in US-China business development. Her mother, Barbara Lim Hing, emigrated from the Philippines and served as a school teacher. She grew up in Solon, Ohio.

Education 

Wen attended Solon High School, where she was the valedictorian. She was selected as one of 120 U.S. Presidential Scholars, high school seniors invited to Washington DC to meet then President Bill Clinton. As a Presidential Scholar, she was invited by the Taiwanese government to attend the study tour program at Chien Tan, which eventually formed the setting of her first novel, Loveboat, Taipei.

Wen studied at Harvard University, earning her B.A. magna cum laude in government and international relations. She wrote her senior thesis on China under Professor Roderick MacFarquhar. She served on the student governing board of the Harvard Institute of Politics (IOP). Wen earned her JD at Columbia Law School and MFA in Writing from Vermont College of Fine Arts, studying under Kathi Appelt, A.M. Jenkins, and Martine Leavitt.

Career 
Prior to moving to Silicon Valley, Wen spent ten years in Washington DC, working on Capitol Hill for the Senate Judiciary Committee, as a law clerk to the Honorable Judge Judith W. Rogers on the United States Court of Appeals for the DC Circuit, and in private practice at the international law firms of Sullivan & Cromwell and Covington & Burling.

Literary career 

In 2019, Wen's debut novel, Loveboat, Taipei, sold in a multi-house auction to HarperCollins, for a two-book deal. It debuted at #9 on the New York Times Bestseller List where it remained for multiple weeks. Loveboat, Taipei was published on January 7, 2020, by HarperTeen. The story is inspired by Wen's experience on the Love Boat program. Wen and Loveboat, Taipei have been featured in NBC Bay Area Show, World Journal, the South China Morning Post, Cosmopolitan, and People en Español. The novel appeared on a number of Most Anticipated lists including The Boston Globe.Book Riot, Bustle, BuzzFeed, The UK Evening Standard, The Nerd Daily, Seventeen, and She Reads. Loveboat, Taipei was selected as a Barnes & Noble Young Adult Book Club Pick and it appeared at number 1 on Cosmopolitan's 25 Best Audiobooks of 2020 list.

In June 2021, Wen was featured in the Forbes AI Ethics series, where she talked about her role in Partnership on AI, as well as her upcoming literary works. Her second novel, Loveboat Reunion, comes out in January 2022, as well as The Idiom Algorithm, a short story she wrote for the Macmillan Serendipity anthology. A third novel, Loveboat Forever, set six years after Loveboat, Taipei, will be released in late 2023.

Technology 

Wen works in venture capital and artificial intelligence in Silicon Valley.

Wen serves as a board observer for Two Bit Circus, a Los Angeles-based virtual reality entertainment company. She serves as co-chair of the Partnership on AI Expert Working Group for Fairness, Transparency and Accountability.

Wen hosts the podcast Intel on AI. Her guests have included founders in the field, such as Andrew Ng and Yann LeCun, as well as Google DeepMind, US Congress, The World Bank and leading AI faculty at MIT, Stanford, and University of California, Berkeley.

Personal life 

Her maternal grandparents are from Xiamen, China. Her maternal grandfather, Amado Lim, was a self-made businessman and philanthropist who co-founded the Metropolitan Medical Center in Manila and served as its first chairman. She has a younger brother and sister who are twins.

Bibliography

Novels 

 Loveboat, Taipei. HarperCollins (2020)
 Loveboat Reunion. HarperCollins (2022)
 Loveboat Forever, HarperCollins (2023)

Short stories 

 The Idiom Algorithm. Macmillan Serendipity anthology (2022)

References 

1977 births
21st-century American women writers
Columbia Law School alumni
Harvard College alumni
Living people
Novelists from Virginia
Vermont College of Fine Arts alumni
Writers from Wheeling, West Virginia